Ryūnosuke, Ryunosuke or Ryuunosuke (written: 龍之介, 隆之介, 竜之介 or 龍之助) is a masculine Japanese given name. Notable people with the name by the character combination will be grouped as:

, Japanese writer
, Japanese businessperson
, Japanese screenwriter
, Imperial Japanese Navy admiral
, Japanese weightlifter
, Japanese actor
, Japanese squash player

, Japanese actor and voice actor
, Japanese footballer

, Japanese footballer

, Japanese footballer

Fictional characters
, character in the anime and light novel series The Pet Girl of Sakurasou
, character in the anime and manga series Bungo Stray Dogs
, a character from Assassination Classroom
, character in the manga series Urusei Yatsura
, character in video game and anime series Hakuouki
Ryunosūke Naruhōdo, character in the Ace Attorney series
, character in the manga series All Purpose Cultural Cat Girl Nuku Nuku
, character in the anime and manga series Haikyuu!! with the position of wing spiker from Karasuno High
 , character in the light novel series Fate/Zero
 , character in the manga series Love Me for Who I Am
 , character in the anime and manga series Starry Sky

See also 
 Sasuke, a masculine Japanese given name

Japanese masculine given names